Li Xintian is the name of:

 Li Xintian (psychologist), Chinese psychologist
 Li Xintian (writer), Chinese writer